Passiflora antioquiensis, the red banana passionfruit, is a species in the family Passifloraceae. It is native to Colombia and is named for the Antioquia Department in Colombia where the type specimen was collected. It was originally described by Gustav Karl Wilhelm Hermann Karsten in 1859. It has gained the Royal Horticultural Society's Award of Garden Merit. With Passiflora tripartita var. mollissima it was hybridised in the Veitch Nurseries in Exeter, England in the 1870s to yield Passiflora × exoniensis, which has also gained the Award of Garden Merit.

References

External links

antioquinensis